The Royal Navy of Morocco is a branch of the military of Morocco responsible for conducting naval operations. 
The Royal Moroccan Navy is administratively managed by the Administration of Defence, which is (de facto) commanded by King Mohammed VI, the commander-in-chief of the Moroccan Armed Forces.

Mission 
The Royal Moroccan Navy is part of the Moroccan Armed Forces. Its mission includes the protection of Moroccan territory and sovereignty, as well as the control of Morocco's 81,000-square-nautical mile Exclusive Economic Zone. Given Morocco's significant coastline (2,952 km) and strategic position overseeing the Strait of Gibraltar, it (along with Spain and the United Kingdom) is deeply involved in the security of this important international waterway.

History 
The history of the modern Royal Moroccan Navy began in 1960 with its foundation by King Mohammed V. The first admiral of the modern Moroccan Navy was Vice Admiral Mohammed Triki, who held the position as the Commander in Chief of the Royal Moroccan Navy for 14 years from 1991 to 2005, and devoted 46 years of services to the Moroccan Navy. Vice Admiral Triki was awarded these decorations: (from Morocco) Legion of the Order of Commander, Knight of the Order of the Throne by his majesty King Hassan II; (from France)  Legion of Honor by President Jacques Chirac; (from USA) Legion of Merit by President Bill Clinton; and (from Spain) Legion of Merit.
Although the modern Royal Navy was structured following independence, the Moroccan naval military traces its roots back to the 11th century, with the rise of the Almoravid dynasty, and its ambition for naval hegemony in the Mediterranean Sea. Admiral Abdullah Ben Meimoun is credited for being the first commander of the  Almoravid dynasty organized naval forces.
With the Almohad dynasty taking over most of northern Africa, together with Al-Andalus, the Almohad dynasty navy soon became the "first fleet of the Mediterranean". At its peak, the Almohad navy's military reputation was well known, inciting Ayyubid dynasty Egypt and Saladin to seek its help in preventing Crusades expeditions.
The 16th century had the starting decline of the Moroccan state and consequently the navy that served it. The capture of major coastal cities and locations by Spain and Portugal much affected Morocco's naval capabilities.

Bases 
The main bases of the Royal Moroccan Navy are located in:
Casablanca
Al Hoceima
Dakhla
Agadir
Ksar Sghir
Laayoune
Tangier

Equipment

Warships 

{
  "type": "FeatureCollection",
  "features": [
    {
      "type": "Feature",
      "properties": {},
      "geometry": {
        "type": "LineString",
        "coordinates": [
          [
            -5.570927,
            35.848563
          ],
          [
            -5.583544,
            35.843065
          ],
          [
            -5.576935,
            35.835131
          ],
          [
            -5.563116,
            35.841256
          ],
          [
            -5.570154,
            35.848702
          ]
        ]
      }
    }
  ]
}

Amphibious and auxiliary vessels

Inshore patrol vessels
 P-32
El Wacil (203)
El Jail (204)
El Mikdam (205)
El Khafir (206)
El Haris (207)
Essahir (208)
Erraid (209)
Erraced (210)
El Kaced (211)
Essaid (212)
 VCSM/RPB 20 (107-116)
 Rodman-101 (130-139)
 Arcor-46 (D01-D18) In Service with Moroccan Customs
 15 Arcor-53 In Service with Moroccan Gendarmerie
 2 Griffon 500TD hovercraft In service with Moroccan Gendarmerie
 10 Rodman-55
 10 Arcor-17
 No boats of this class have been built yet. Russia has offered the sub for sale to India, but in 2005, India ordered Scorpène-class submarines instead. On 4 July 2013, Rosoboronexport announced they will offer the Amur 1650 to the Moroccan Navy if they announce a tender for new submarines.[5]

Aircraft

Notable sailors

 Abdellah Ben Aïcha, admiral of Salé, ambassador to king Louis XIV of France in 1689.
 Abdelkader Perez, ambassador to England in 1723 and again in 1737.
 Abdellah Ben Soleïman, commander of the Almohad fleet under sultan [Abd al-Mu'min]
 Abdellah Ben Taâ Allah, commander of the Almohad fleet under Muhammad an-Nasir and governor of Majorca
 Corsair Triki of Salé, 17th century.
 Vice Admiral Mohammed Triki of Safi, Commander in Chief of the Royal Moroccan Navy from July 1991 to June 2005.

Gallery

See also

 Military of Morocco

References

 
Military of Morocco
Morocco
Military units and formations established in 1960
1960 establishments in Morocco